Sleepaway Camp IV: The Survivor is the fifth installment (fourth chronologically) in the Sleepaway Camp film series. The film was initially canned during production in 1992; in 2012, the film was completed using archive footage from the first three films, and was given its own on-demand DVD release.

Plot
In 1993, four years after the third film, Allison Kramer (Carrie Chambers) is plagued by gruesome nightmares that revisit a campsite. Unable to recall the actual occurrences due to a forced mental block, she seeks the help of a psychiatrist in overcoming her insomnia.

After numerous visits and hypnosis, Allison's psychiatrist tells her that she is seemingly a survivor of a camp massacre which occurred over a decade ago. Her disbelief of the whole situation inclines the psychiatrist to advise her to return to the site for an afternoon, in hopes that if she were to see the scene of the crime, she would remember and overcome them.

Doubtful, Allison sets out for the camp she attended but never remembered. When she reaches her destination she finds the camp closed and abandoned, the land now Federal Property. She reminisces about the events that occurred in the original trilogy. Allison narrates over many of these scenes. Archive footage from the first three films are organized into themes, such as Angela being afraid of water. Allison looks for a ranger, Jack (John Lodicos), that her psychologist, Dr. Lewis, told her to meet up with. The ranger tries to have sex with her, but Allison decides things are going too far and runs away. The ranger chases her through the woods. Allison stops as she can run no longer. She is found by a hunter, Eugene (Victor Campos), who almost shoots her out of fear. Later on, she approaches the ranger with the hunter's gun and threatens to kill him if he doesn't stay away from her. She then returns to the hunter and shoots him. In the next scene, Allison is standing in the sun with a knife, which the sun is reflecting off of. The ranger approaches her, but she whirls around and the film freezes as she holds the knife near him. It then cuts to a cabin, where the hunter's and the ranger's decaying bodies can be seen. The credits then roll over the image.

It is then revealed (as implied in the opening crawl) that "Allison" is actually an amnesiac Angela Baker, the killer from the three previous films, being "a woman without identity," due to having been knocked out by an ambulance driver after the events of the third film, and asking "But who is Allison, really?", in addition to her having had flashbacks of certain scenes throughout the original trilogy that only Angela was present for or survived through, realizing her identity upon rediscovering all of her memories at the film's climax, before returning to the psychiatric clinic.

Cast
Carrie Chambers as Allison Kramer / Angela Baker
Victor Campos as Eugene The Hunter
John Lodico as Jack The Ranger

An uncredited actor portrays Dr. Lewis, Allison's psychiatrist.

Many actors from previous films in the series appear via archival footage.

Production
Filming began in October 1992 at Camp Tamarack in Oakland, New Jersey. However, Double Helix Films, the film's production company, went bankrupt during this time, causing the production to shut down. Roughly 34 minutes of footage was shot before shut down; a trailer was also made. In 2002 the footage from the first day of shooting was released as an exclusive fourth disc for the Best Buy Red Cross edition of the Region 1 Sleepaway Camp Survival Kit DVD box set. There were 2 versions of the Survival Kit released, with only the Best Buy edition including the fourth disc. Both versions are now long out of print, with the 4-disc edition being the rarest. Ten years later, the official feature film version was finally released by Retrosploitation via CreateSpace and Amazon. The final version was edited by filmmaker Dustin Ferguson and produced by John Klyza of SleepawayCampFilms.com.

Release

Availability
In November 2010, Fangoria magazine made an official announcement of the film's completion. The final version was announced to run just over 70 minutes and was released on DVD on March 23, 2012. It is available at CreateSpace and Amazon.

References

External links
 

1992 films
American slasher films
American sequel films
Alternative sequel films
Sleepaway Camp (film series)
American independent films
Films shot in New Jersey
Transgender-related films
1990s unfinished films
Films set in 1993
LGBT-related horror films
Backwoods slasher films
1992 LGBT-related films
1990s English-language films
1990s American films